Jason Kralt (born February 8, 1974) is a former Canadian football linebacker who played seven seasons in the Canadian Football League with the BC Lions and Ottawa Renegades. He was drafted by the BC Lions in the third round of the 1999 CFL Draft. He played CIS football at Carleton University and attended Nepean High School in Ottawa, Ontario.

References

External links
Just Sports Stats
Fanbase profile

Living people
1974 births
Canadian football linebackers
Carleton Ravens football players
BC Lions players
Ottawa Renegades players
Players of Canadian football from Ontario
Canadian football people from Ottawa